Neurochaetidae is a family of flies belonging to the order Diptera.

Genera:
 Anthoclusia Hennig, 1965
 Neurochaeta McAlpine, 1978
 Neurocytta McAlpine, 1988
 Neurotexis McAlpine, 1988
 Nothoasteia Malloch, 1936

References

Opomyzoidea
Opomyzoidea genera